Maumee Bay on Lake Erie is located in the U.S. state of Ohio, just east of the city of Toledo. The bay and the surrounding wetlands form most of the Maumee River basin, and in 1975 part of the area was incorporated into Maumee Bay State Park. The park is not huge, covering , but its wetlands feature some of the best bird watching in the United States. The Maumee Bay area is a popular vacation spot in the Midwest, featuring several resorts and a golf course.

North Maumee Bay 

North Maumee Bay is a smaller part of Maumee Bay which combines the outflow of the Ottawa River, Halfway Creek, Rapideau Drain, Flat Creek, Little Lake Creek and Bay Creek.

Historical Images of Maumee Bay

References 
Maumee Bay State Park homepage

Wetlands of Ohio
Bodies of water of Lucas County, Ohio
Bodies of water of Monroe County, Michigan
Bays of Lake Erie